Big John @ Breakfast is the current breakfast show on local radio station Hallam FM, in South Yorkshire, UK, and has been on air since 2000.

It is presented by John Harrison "Big John", Producer James and Liesl Soards.

The show is broadcast live across South Yorkshire weekdays from 6am to 10am.

Awards 
2002 New York Radio Awards - "Best Breakfast Show" - Gold 

2005 Sony Radio Awards - “Promo Award - Get Me To The Church On Time” 

2015 Arqiva Radio Awards - “Breakfast Show of the Year” 

2016 ARIAS Radio Awards - “Hallam FM - Station of the Year” 

2018 ARIAS Radio Awards - “Best Music Presenter at Breakfast” Nomination 

2020 ARIAS Radio Awards - “Best Music Breakfast Show” Nomination

References

External links
 Hallam FM Website: https://planetradio.co.uk/hallam/presenters/big-john-breakfast/
 Facebook: https://www.facebook.com/BigJohnHallamFM/
 Twitter: https://twitter.com/bigjohnhallamfm/
 Instagram: https://www.instagram.com/bigjohnhallamfm/
 YouTube https://www.youtube.com/bigjohnharrison/

British radio breakfast shows
2000 radio programme debuts